The House in the Tree is a 1913 American silent short film written by Lloyd Lonergan starring William Garwood and Billie Bennett.

Cast
Josie Ashdown
Victory Bateman
Billie Bennett
Howard Davies 
William Garwood
Dimitri Mitsoras
Muriel Ostriche
Vera Sisson
Billie West

External links

1913 films
American silent short films
American black-and-white films
1910s American films